Machines of Loving Grace was an American industrial rock band from Tucson, Arizona, best known for their song "Butterfly Wings".

History

Formation
Named after the Richard Brautigan poem "All Watched Over by Machines of Loving Grace", Machines of Loving Grace formed in 1989. The original lineup consisted of Scott Benzel (vocals), Stuart Kupers (guitar and bass), and Mike Fisher (keyboards), with Brad Kemp (drums) added shortly thereafter. They recorded a demo and were picked up by Carrboro, North Carolina-based Mammoth Records in 1991. The band was unable to re-record their material for their eponymous debut album, as the label released their demo as it was recorded.

Concentration
Two years later, the band released Concentration. Its sound spanned a wide range of styles. The band released two videos, and gained MTV airplay.

In 1994 they recorded a new song, "Golgotha Tenement Blues", for the soundtrack to the film The Crow.

Gilt
In 1995, Machines of Loving Grace released their third album, Gilt.  This record was marked by an increased guitar presence and a darker overall tone than Concentration. It was produced by Sylvia Massy and recorded at the Indigo Ranch studio in Malibu, California.

New band members included David Suycott (formerly of Stabbing Westward and Spies Who Surf) on drums, Ray Riendeau (bass) and Tom Coffeen (guitar). A remix of the song "Richest Junkie Still Alive" was included on the soundtrack to Hackers. The song "Tryst" was released on the ill-fated Mega Man soundtrack.

That year, various mixes of three songs from Concentration — "Perfect Tan", "Butterfly Wings", and "Lilith/Eve" — were featured in the horror film Devour. "Butterfly Wings" was also featured on the television show Due South, in the episodes "Chicago Holiday" and "Flashback".

Breakup–present
In 1997, the band broke up while working on an album project called Love Scenes at the Slave Market; the project was abandoned.

As of 2006, Benzel is involved with an electronic band called Soulo. Mike Fisher is currently with Amish Rake Fight.

In 2008, "Butterfly Wings" from 1993's Concentration was featured on the soundtrack of the motion picture Punisher: War Zone.

Stuart Kupers died on November 14, 2021 after a long battle with Gaucher and Parkinson’s Diseases.

Members
 Scott Benzel: vocals (1989–1997)
 Mike Fisher: keyboards (1989–1997)
 Stuart Kupers: guitar and bass (1989–1995)
 Brad Kemp: drums (1989–1995)
 Jonathan Frank: drums (1996)
 Ray Riendeau: bass (1995–1997)
 David Suycott: drums (1996–1997)
 Tom Coffeen: guitar (1995–1997)

Discography

Albums
Machines of Loving Grace (1991)
Concentration (1993)
Gilt (1995)

Singles

Music videos
 "X-Insurrection"
 Directed by Kevin Borque
 "Butterfly Wings"
 Directed by Julie Hermelin
 "Perfect Tan (Bikini Atoll)"
 Directed by Julie Hermelin
 "Golgotha Tenement Blues"
 "Richest Junkie Still Alive"
 Directed by John Reece

References

External links
Interview @ Chaos Control Digizine

Musical groups from Tucson, Arizona
Rock music groups from Arizona
American industrial rock musical groups